Ironsides Island is an uninhabited rocky island in the Saint Lawrence River, and part of the Thousand Islands region near Alexandria Bay, New York. It is in both Jefferson and St. Lawrence counties. Most of the island lies in the Town of Alexandria, in Jefferson County, while its northeasternmost corner lies in the Town of Hammond, in St. Lawrence County. The island is located near Kring Point State Park.

The  island has  cliffs along its waterfront, and its vegetation is dominated by white pine trees. It was donated by former Reader's Digest ad executive William Browning to The Nature Conservancy in the late 1960s to ensure protection of the island's great blue heron rookery. Over a thousand herons return to breed every April.  It was declared a National Natural Landmark in 1967.

Prior permission from The Nature Conservancy is required to land on the island, but it can easily be viewed from the water.

See also
List of National Natural Landmarks in New York

References

External links
The Nature Conservancy: Central & Western New York Chapter

National Natural Landmarks in New York (state)
Islands of the Thousand Islands in New York (state)
Nature Conservancy preserves in New York (state)
Protected areas of St. Lawrence County, New York
Protected areas of Jefferson County, New York
Nature reserves in New York (state)
Islands of Jefferson County, New York
Islands of St. Lawrence County, New York
Uninhabited islands of New York (state)